Antonio Dias (born 20 August 1893, date of death unknown) was a Brazilian footballer. He played in four matches for the Brazil national football team in 1917. He was also part of Brazil's squad for the 1917 South American Championship.

References

External links
 

1893 births
Year of death missing
Brazilian footballers
Brazil international footballers
Place of birth missing
Association football forwards
Sport Club Corinthians Paulista players
Maranhão Atlético Clube players